The Coast to Coast Athletic Conference men's basketball tournament is the annual conference basketball championship tournament for the NCAA Division III Coast to Coast Athletic Conference (C2C), known before November 2020 as the Capital Athletic Conference. The tournament has been held annually since 1991. It is a single-elimination tournament and seeding is based on regular-season records.

The tournament winner receives C2C's automatic bid to the NCAA Division III Men's Basketball Championship.

Results

Capital Athletic Conference

Coast to Coast Athletic Conference

Championship records

 Frostburg State, Gallaudet, Penn State–Harrisburg, Pine Manor, Southern Virginia, and Stevenson never reached the tournament finals as CAC/C2C members. All except Southern Virginia and Pine Manor left the CAC before the 2020 conference rebranding, and Southern Virginia and Pine Manor left C2C in July 2021.
 Finlandia, Pratt, UC Santa Cruz, and Warren Wilson have not yet reached the C2C tournament finals. 
 Schools highlighted in pink are former CAC/C2C members.

References

NCAA Division III men's basketball conference tournaments
Basketball, Men's, Tournament
Recurring sporting events established in 1991